Aaron D. Truesdell was a Michigan politician.

Career
Truesdell was a Whig. In an election spanning from November 5 to 6, 1838 Truesdell was elected to the position of Washtenaw County Commissioner. In this election, he received 2,144 votes. In 1840, Truesdell was re-elected to this position and received 2,487 votes.

On November 2, 1846, Truesdell was elected to the Michigan House of Representatives where he represented the Washtenaw County district from January 4, 1847 to March 17, 1847. During this term, he served on the Agriculture and Manufactures committee. On November 5, 1850, Truesdell was again elected to the Michigan House of Representatives where he represented the Washtenaw County district February 5, 1851 to December 31, 1852. During this second term, Truesdell served on the Harboring committee and the Printing committee.

Personal life
Truesdell lived in Bridgewater Township, Michigan.

References

Year of birth missing
Year of death missing
County commissioners in Michigan
Members of the Michigan House of Representatives
Michigan Whigs
People from Washtenaw County, Michigan
19th-century American politicians